Filippa Désirée Amanda Cay Reinfeldt (née Holmberg; 14 June 1967) is a Swedish politician of the Moderate Party. She served as Health Service Commissioner of Stockholm County from 2006 to 2014, with responsible for health care, social affairs and hospitals. She was previously mayor of Täby Municipality from 2005 to 2006. In July 2019, she was appointed the Moderate Partys spokesperson on LGBT-issues. 

She was married to former Prime Minister Fredrik Reinfeldt from 1992 until their divorce in 2013. They have three children together.

Career 
Reinfeldt was Municipal Commissioner of Täby, Uppland, from 2002 and Mayor and Chairperson (Mayor) of the Täby Municipal Executive from 2005 until 2006. Reinfeldt was appointed to several posts (förtroendevald) in the Stockholm City Council from 1991 to 1994 and councillor in the Stockholm County Council from 1994.

Filippa Reinfeldt's position as a politician was used by the Swedish Social Democratic Party to criticise Fredrik Reinfeldt during the 2006 Swedish general election. Following the 2006 general election Filippa Reinfeldt was re-elected as a Mayor in Täby with the Moderate Party alone gaining over 50% of the votes in the Täby municipal election. She resigned shortly afterwards in order to become County Commissioner of Health Services in the administration of Chris Heister.

On 16 October 2014 she challenged incumbent Finance Commissioner Torbjörn Rosdahl following the 2014 general election but lost, with the votes 20 for her against 22 for Rosdahl. She subsequently announced that she will retire from politics.

On 19 December 2014, Dagens Industri revealed that Reinfeldt would become a partner of private-owned health care company Aleris with responsible for business development and public affairs by February 2015.

Personal life 
Filippa Reinfeldt met her future husband Fredrik Reinfeldt in 1989 when the two presided at the Moderate Youth League. They married in 1992 in Skeppsholmskyrkan and later moved to Täby. On 7 March 2012, the couple announced their separation. On 11 July, the couple signed their divorce application (customarily pending for six months). On 20 February 2013, they signed the last papers that finalised their divorce. They have three children.

References

External links

Moderaterna i Täby - Filippa Reinfeldt
Filippa Reinfeldt at the Moderate Party website 
The Local - Introducing Filippa Reinfeldt(humorous profile in English)

|-

|-

|-

|-

|-

|-

1967 births
Living people
Politicians from Stockholm
Spouses of prime ministers of Sweden
Moderate Party politicians
Municipal commissioners of Sweden
Women mayors of places in Sweden
21st-century Swedish women politicians